Franklin Township is an inactive township in Laclede County, in the U.S. state of Missouri.

Franklin Township was established in 1874, taking its name from Franklin County, Missouri.

References

Townships in Missouri
Townships in Laclede County, Missouri